IMS-1 is an Earth observation satellite in a sun-synchronous orbit. The satellite which is the fourteenth satellite in the Indian Remote Sensing (IRS) satellite series has been built, launched and maintained by the Indian Space Research Organisation (ISRO). IMS-1 is the first satellite to use ISRO's Indian Mini Satellite bus.

It was launched by the Polar Satellite Launch Vehicle - C9 on April 28, 2008 along with the Cartosat-2A and eight nano research satellites belonging to research facilities in Canada, Denmark, Germany, Japan and the Netherlands.

See also
Indian Remote Sensing satellite
List of Indian satellites

References

External links
 IMS-1

Satellites orbiting Earth
Earth observation satellites of India
Mini satellites of India
Spacecraft launched in 2008